Johann Kastenberger (born 1 October 1958 in Sankt Leonhard am Forst, died 15 November 1988 in Sankt Pölten, Lower Austria) was an Austrian marathon runner, bank robber and murderer. He infamously committed his crimes while wearing a Ronald Reagan mask, earning him the nickname Pumpgun Ronnie. Kastenberger's criminal life was the basis for the 2010 film The Robber.

On 25 January 1977 Kastenberger robbed a Volksbank branch in Pressbaum, making off with 70,000 Austrian Schillings (~€5,000). Shortly thereafter, police arrested Kastenberger on a train at Wien Westbahnhof based on descriptions given to police by the bank's employees. He served a seven-year prison sentence for the robbery. Upon release, he moved in with his girlfriend in the Simmering district of Vienna.

On 13 August 1985 Kastenberger stormed the Raiffeisen Bank in Hafnerbach, but had to flee without having taken any money. The police suspected Kastenberger immediately, but his girlfriend gave him a false alibi. On 20 November 1987 he robbed the Raiffeisen Bank in Haunoldstein, making off with 88,000 Schillings (~€6,400). On 19 February 1988 he hit three banks in succession, making off with a combined total of more than 1.8 million Schillings (~€133,000). His biggest haul was on 21 March 1988, at a Länderbank branch in Vienna, where he captured two million Schillings (~€145,000). The next two days he robbed two more Viennese banks, netting one million Schillings for each.

Murders

On 13 August 1985, the same day he committed his first bank robbery after being released from prison, Kastenberger shot and killed Ewald Pollhammer, a 28-year-old man from Upper Austria with whom he had been annoyed during a vocational training course.

Additionally, Kastenberger is regarded the prime suspect of three other murders:

Kastenberger is suspected of having robbed a gas station in Purkersdorf on 26 May 1984, shooting and killing 51-year-old station attendant Helene Bubendorfer with an assault rifle.
Kastenberger is suspected of using an assault rifle to kill officer Friedrich Roger in front of a police station in Vienna on 25 July 1986.
Kastenberger is suspected of using a stolen government service weapon to kill Brigitte Hranka, who worked as a prostitute.

Arrest, flight and death

On 11 November 1988 Kastenberger was arrested and convicted of all deeds, after which he made a confession. In his apartment, investigators found two keys for safe deposit boxes containing almost 5.5 million Schillings (~€400,000). Two days later, during his confession proceedings, Kastenberger jumped out the window on the first floor, landed on the hood of a parked car and escaped.

The next day he tried to steal a woman's car in Gaaden, but fled when a police patrol drove by. The next day, he overpowered a man in Maria Enzersdorf, bound him and stole his car. The man freed himself and alerted police who discovered the stolen vehicle on the motorway shortly thereafter. Kastenberger noticed the police, pulled over to the guardrail, then ran through the woods and stole another vehicle in Waasen, with which he escaped via the West Highway. Just before Sankt Pölten, he broke through a roadblock and was shot in the back. Before Kastenberger could be apprehended by police, he took his own life with a gunshot to the head.

The pursuit of Johann Kastenberger was the largest investigation in Austria's post-war history, involving more than 450 officers.

Other

Kastenberger was a successful marathon runner. In the 1980s he won several national races in Austria and in 1988 became the record holder of Kainach Mountain Marathon with a time of 3:16:07.

In 2009, director Benjamin Heisenberg dramatized Kastenberger's career as a runner and bank robber in his film The Robber, with Andreas Lust in the title role, based on Martin Prinz's 2002 novel of the same name. The novel was translated into English in 2005 by Mike Mitchell and renamed On the Run. The film premiered in February 2010 at the 60th Berlin Film Festival.

References

1958 births
1988 deaths
1988 suicides
Austrian people convicted of murder
Bank robbers
Suicides by firearm in Austria
Suspected serial killers